The Kurnell Refinery was a crude oil refinery located in Kurnell on Botany Bay, New South Wales, Australia. It was operated by Caltex Australia, and owned by the Chevron Corporation.

History
Construction began on the refinery in 1953. About 3,000 men worked at the project's various sites during the peak of construction. It was further expanded in 1964 and 1973.

On 26 July 2012, Caltex announced its decision to close the refinery in the second half of 2014. Caltex said that the closure would eliminate about 330 direct positions, and as many as 300 contracting jobs. The refinery ceased operation in October 2014 and was converted into an import terminal to supply imported fuel for Australian customers.

Technical features

The site of the refinery also has a  wharf that can handle ships up to 60,000 DWT.

References

Buildings and structures in Sydney
Kurnell Peninsula
Oil refineries in Australia
1956 establishments in Australia
2014 disestablishments in Australia
Kurnell, New South Wales